Festuca edlundiae, commonly known as Edlund's fescue, is a native, perennial tufted grass found in Alaska, Canadian arctic islands, northern Greenland, far eastern arctic Russia and Svalbard. The specific name honours Doctor Sylvia Edlund, a Canadian botanist. It was first described by Susan Aiken, Laurie Consaul and Leonard Lefkovitch in 1995.

Description 
It is closely related to Festuca brachyphylla. The plant is similar to boreal fescue (Festuca hyperborea) but has flag leaf (final leaf) blades that are 5 mm or longer and has larger spikelets. It grows in dense clumps without rhizomes.

Habitat 
The plant grows in the High Arctic in fine-grained and calcareous soils.

References

External links 
 
 

edlundiae
Grasses of Canada
Grasses of the United States
Grasses of Russia
Flora of North America
Flora of Northern Europe
Plants described in 1995